Samsan station (formerly Pandae station) is a railway station in Yangpyeong County, South Korea. It is on the Jungang Line.

External links
 Cyber station information from Korail

Railway stations in Gyeonggi Province
Yangpyeong County
Railway stations opened in 1965